The Quincy Municipal Airport  is a public-use airport located  northeast of the central business district of the city of Quincy in Gadsden County, Florida, United States. The airport is publicly owned.
The nearest airline service and jet fuel is 20 miles (32 km) away at Tallahassee International Airport (KTLH).
The airport appears on the western edge of the Jacksonville VFR sectional. Taxi service is limited to none at all.

Runways and facilities
The Quincy Airport does have a single 2,964' X 75', paved, lighted runway. Runway 14/32 has low intensity edge lighting.  Both ends of the runway have displaced thresholds for landing.  Full length of the paved surface is available for takeoff in both directions.  There are no paved taxiways. The airport has a grass landing area which has existed since 1932.

Runway 14: Runway heading- 137 magnetic, 136 true  Displaced threshold: approx 150 ft.

Runway 32: Runway heading- 317 magnetic, 316 true; Displaced threshold: 324 ft.

There is a lighted windsock and a rotating beacon near the FBO building on the east side of the runway.  100LL avgas is available at the FBO.  Maintenance is available on the field.  The turf area on the east side of/and parallel to the paved runway is an unofficial turf runway and taxi area.  This area is used by ultralights, gliders, skydivers, homebuilt aircraft, helicopters and occasionally regular aircraft during normal operations. There is a VOR approach off the Seminole (SZW) VOR near Tallahassee and a GPS approach which aren't available 

Since 1994 the airport has been home to The School of Human Flight  (also known as "Skydive Tallahassee") - the only USPA Member dropzone in the Florida panhandle.  parachute operations take place at the airport, with several  jumps made annually. Usually weekends only.

Nearby radio and navigation aids 
VOR radial/distance    VOR name      Freq    Var
 
SZW   r283/9.8      SEMINOLE VORTAC  117.50  02E
 
MAI   r111/31.4     MARIANNA VORTAC  114.00  00E

CTAF/UNICOM:  122.7
 
TALLAHASSEE APPROACH/DEPARTURE:  128.7

WX ASOS at TLH (16 nm SE):  PHONE 850-576-3665

APCH/DEP SERVICE PRVDD BY JAX ARTCC ON FREQS 135.325/343.8 (TALLAHASSEE RCAG) WHEN TALLAHASSEE APCH CTL CLSD.

The airport serves all of the normal functions of a small city airport but seems to specialize in recreational aviation.  The sometimes high volume of sport aviation activities warrant vigilance when operating at or near the airport.  
For more information you can go to http://www.airnav.com/airport/2J9.

Airport governance 
The airport is now an independently chartered entity which is run by the Quincy-Gadsden Airport Authority. The authority has five volunteer members, two appointed by the city, two by the county and one person who is  appointed by board.

The airports phone and mailing addresses are:
QUINCY GADSDEN ARPT AUTH
BOX 1905
QUINCY, FL 32351
Phone 850-6272112

References

External links

Airports in Florida
Transportation buildings and structures in Gadsden County, Florida